Pastorino is an Italian surname. Notable people with the surname include:

Enrique Pastorino (1918–1995), Uruguayan trade union leader and communist politician
Giacomo Pastorino (born 1980), Italian water polo goalkeeper
Luca Pastorino (born 1971), Italian politician
Malvina Pastorino (1916–1994), Argentine film actress
Pelegrina Pastorino (1902-1988), Italianf fashion reporter
Pietro Pastorino (1900–1960s), Italian sprinter

See also 
 Pastorini